= Iglesia del Carmen, Burgos =

Church in Burgos, Spain

Coordinates: 42°20′10″N 3°42′21″W

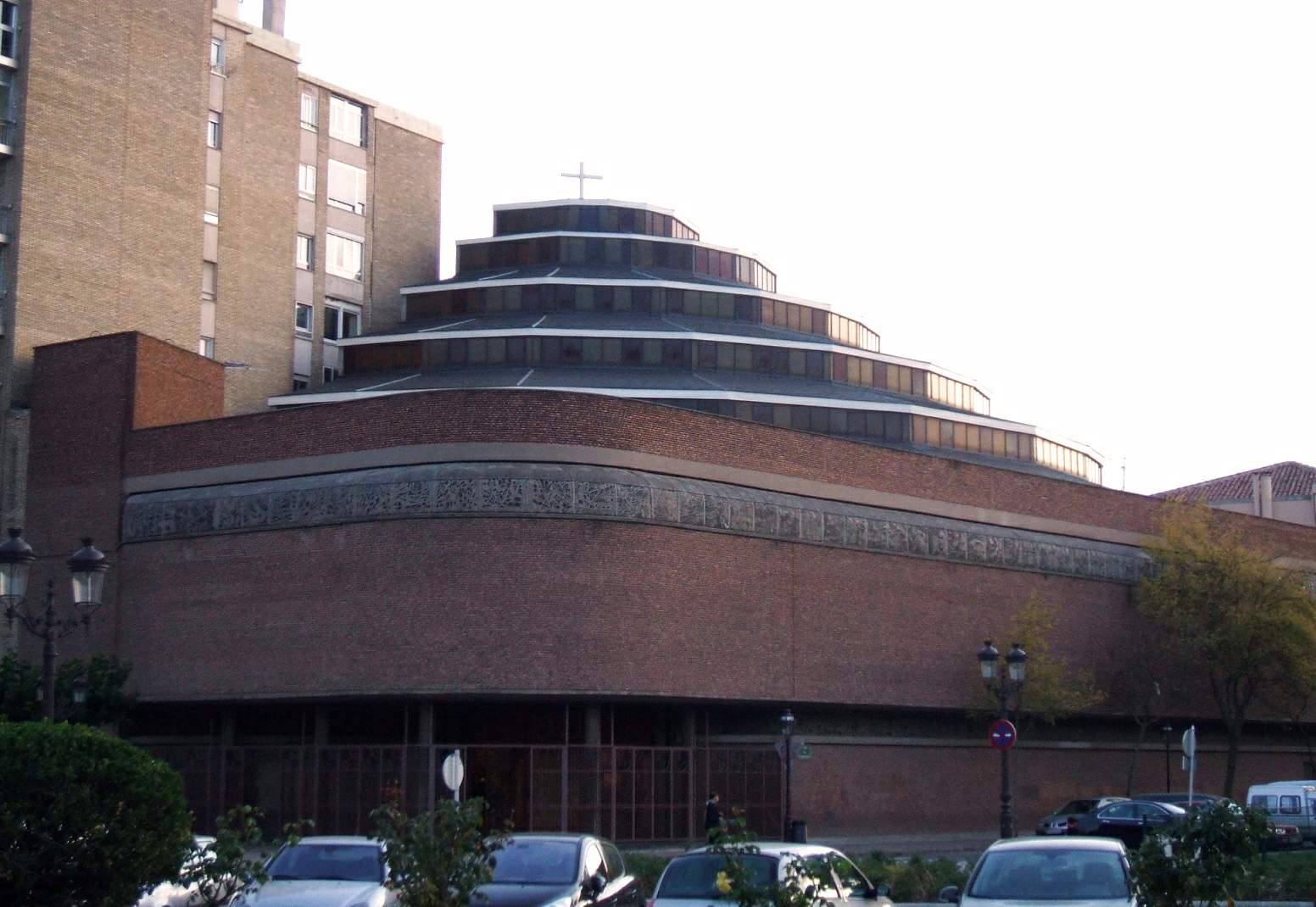
Iglesia del Carmen

The Iglesia del Carmen de Burgos is a Catholic parish church built in Burgos, Castile and León, Spain. It is a modern building, built in 1966–1968, replacing a demolished baroque building. It is located at the intersection of Paseo del Empecinado with Calle del Carmen, between the Arlanzón River and the old railway. The church was inaugurated on 7 July 1968.
